Willis "Bing" Davis (born June 30, 1937) is a contemporary artist and an educator.

Life
Willis "Bing" Davis is an African American Artist and teacher, born in Greer, South Carolina, whose artwork portrays his feelings for life and appreciation for African history and culture. Davis has studied, lived, and taught in both Indiana and Ohio. He graduated from DePauw University in 1959, and from Miami University in 1967. He studied at the Dayton Art Institute, and Indiana State University from 1975 to 1976 "and was also a ceramic and graphic artist who taught a ceramics class at Central State University for 20 years." Though he was also busy teaching during that time, he would always find time to work on his own projects.

"After he retired in 1988, Davis Created the Willis Bing Davis Art Studio & EbonNia Gallery in Dayton, Ohio and has continued to work on international projects in Russia, Bermuda, China, and Ghana in his free time." He is currently the President of the board of directors of the National Conference of Artists. Davis makes art from found objects and often includes mixed media.
He has also worked in photography, drawing, painting, ceramics and sculpture but accounts clay as is his most expressive medium of art due to its direct physical influence from it. He feels that there's a disconnect when a tool separates him from the work such as a brush or a lens. Art to Davis "is a wonderful way to understand self and to understand others."

In his works he would tend to have a strong influence in African and African American textiles. "There's a triangle motif that's common in his art that's borrowed from the patterns found in African Quilts and architecture found in Guana, Africa."  "Among Davis's works many have been featured in public and private collections alike from the U.S.A. Europe and China to Ghana, Senegal and Nigeria with exhibits featured in the Museum of Harlem, the African Craft Museum, the Renwick gallery and many more."

Being an African American and growing up in the civil rights movement has influenced Davis. He likes to use found objects such as nuts and bolts to create pieces of art influenced by what his ancestors in Africa might have made, such as African masks or an installation of an African shrine.
This included the mixed-media triptych "The Struggle as Viewed from the Base of the Wall" which was inspired by the Attica Prison riots.

He was inducted in the DePauw University sports hall of fame.
In 2001, he showed at the Indianapolis Art Center.
In 2010, University of Dayton held a celebration.

References

External links
 Bing's Gallery
 
Willis Bing Davis, an extraordinary artist 
Willis 'Bing' Davis: On the Shoulders of Those Who Came Before

1937 births
Artists from Dayton, Ohio
Living people
People from South Carolina